Lebu may refer to:
 Lebu, Chile, a city and capital of the Arauco Province of the Biobio Region of Chile
 Lebu River, located in the Arauco Province of the Biobio Region of Chile
 LEBU, acronym for Large Eddy Break Up
 Libu or Lebu, Egyptian term for the people of Libya

See also
 Lebou, a Senegalese ethnic group